Ó hÁdhmaill is a Gaelic Irish clan from Ulster. The name is now rendered in many forms, most commonly Hamill. The clan are a branch of Cenél nEógain (specifically, Cenél mBinnigh), belonging to the Uí Néill; they claim descent from Eochu Binneach, the son of Eógan mac Néill. Their descendants in Ireland are found predominantly across Ulster, and County Louth, Leinster.

In Irish if the second part of the surname begins with a vowel 'Á', the form Ó attaches a h to it, this is the h-prothesis mutation. In this case Ádhmaill becomes Ó hÁdhmaill. The other forms effect no change: Ní Adhmaill, (Bean) Uí Adhmaill.

Capitalized as: Ó hÁDHMAILL or Ó ʜÁDHMAILL, the first 'h' should always be either lowercase, or a smaller 'H' font size.

Motto and Coat of Arms
The Motto is Esse Quam Videri, translated as To Be Rather Than To Seem.

The Slogan (battle cry) is "Vestigia nulla retrorsum", translated as No backward steps.

The Coat of Arms is described as being; A shield azure field with two horizontal bars of ermine fur. On top of the shield is a ducal coronet. Atop the coronet is the figure of a leopard in profile, sitting with its face to the viewer's left.
 The Azure/Blue represents Strength, Loyalty and Truth
 The Ermine is associated with the robes and crowns of Royal and Noble Personages
 Ducal Coronet is a crown of a duke
 Leopard in profile is traditionally depicted the same as a lion

History
One of the leading clans of the Cenél mBinnigh, Cenél nEógain a branch of the Northern Uí Néill. They are descendants of Eochach Binnich mac Eógain, son of Eógan mac Néill, son of the fifth-century Néill Noígiallaig (Niall of the Nine Hostages), founder of the Uí Néill dynasty. Cenél mBinnigh where the first clan of the Cenél nEógain (Cenél nEóghain) to advance from Inishowen.

The O'Hamills continued to move from North Ulster with the Northern Ui Neill's, and ruled territory in County Tyrone and County Armagh, South Ulster.
 Hereditary Chief or Clan chief; Ua hAghmaill (O'Hamill), Teallach Duibhbrailbe.
 Cinéal (Kinship); Cenél nEógain (Cinel Eoghain).
 Finte (Clans); Ua Brolaigh, herenaghs of Tech na Coimairce and Clongleigh.
 Branches;
Cenél mBinnig Glinne in the valley of Glenconkeine, barony of Loughinsholin
Cenél mBindigh Locha Droichid east of Magh Ith in Tirone (County Tyrone)
Cenél mBindigh Tuaithe Rois and one branch of the Ua Brolaigh, east of the River Foyle and north of the barony of Loughinsholin

 Niall Noi nGiallach - Néill Noígiallaig - Niall of the Nine Hostages
 Eógan mac Néill - Eoghan mac Niall (Cenél nEógain - Cenél nEóghain - Cineál Eoghain)
 Eochach Binnich mac Eógain - Och Binnigh mac Eoghan (Cenél mBinnigh - CineálnBinnigh)
 Ua hAghmaill - Ó hÁdhmaill - O'Hamill

Irish-English Hamill
Prior to the middle of the 20th century, Irish was usually written using the Gaelic typefaces, in this case the surname appeared as Ó hÁḋmaıll. The dot above the lenited letter (ḋ) was replaced by the letters dh from the standard Roman alphabet changing it to Ó hÁdhmaıll. Also the Irish language makes no graphemic distinction between dotted i and dotless ı so at the same time it changed to Ó hÁdhmaill.

As the dh is silent, the pronunciation is similar to spelling it as O'Hamill which is how it came to be spelt when it was phonetically anglicised, over time the spelling lost the O and changed to Hamill, giving us the modern Irish-English spelling of Hamill.

Notable people include

 Community 

 Tara Uí Adhmaill, Educator, specialising in the teaching of Irish to adults with expertise in raising children with Irish and Co-Founder of Glór Mológa, an Irish language community group based in Dublin South Central.

Historic
 Giolla Criost Ó hAdhmaill, taoiseach of Clann Adhmaill who fought with the last King of Ulaid, Ruaidhrí Mac Duinnshléibhe against John de Courcy in 1177.
 Ruarcan O'Hamill, chief Poet to O'HanlonAnnals of Loch Cé, LC1376.4

Professional
 Judge William G.J. Hamill, Judge of the District Court
 , Conradh na Gaeilge & Glór na nGael.
 Dr. Feilim O'Hadhmaill, Programme Director & Lecturer at University College Cork, in Applied Social Studies.
 Cormac Ó hÁdhmaill, BBC TV Presenter
 Éamonn Ó hAdhmaill, TV Presenter and editor

Sport
 Tomás O’hAmaill (sic), Tomás Hamill, Tipperary senior inter-county hurling team

Military
 Peadar Ó hÁḋmaıll, Peter Hamill, Na Fianna Éireann 1st Brigade, 4th Northern Division, No. 5. Sec., Dún Dealgan
 Thomas Hamill (1878-1955), Irish Volunteers, 4 Battalion, Cycling Corps and Irish Republican Army, 1 Brigade, 4 Northern Division, Dundalk
 Thomas Hamill, Dunleer
 Thomas Hamill, Irish Volunteers and Irish Republican Army, Dublin. Served in 1 Battalion, G Company, Dublin Brigade.
 Thomas Hamill, Na Fianna Éireann, 1st Battalion Belfast Brigade
 William Hamill, Na Fianna Éireann, 3rd (Armagh) Brigade, 4th Northern Division, Armagh City Sluagh attached to Armagh City Batt.
 Barney Hamill, Na Fianna Éireann, 3rd (Armagh) Brigade, 4th Northern Division, Derrytrasna Sluagh attached to Lurgan Batt.
 George Hamill, Irish Republican Army (1919–1922), Lurgan Battalion, B Company Lurgan
 James Hamill, Irish Republican Army (1919–1922), Lurgan Battalion, C Company Derrymacash
 Thomas Hamill, Irish Republican Army (1919–1922), A Company, Dungannon Battalion, No. 1 Brigade, 2nd Northern Division
 James Hamill, Irish Republican Army (1919–1922), A Company, Dungannon Battalion, No. 1 Brigade, 2nd Northern Division
 John Hamill, Irish Republican Army (1919–1922), B Company, Dungannon Battalion, No. 1 Brigade, 2nd Northern Division
 James Hamill, Irish Republican Army (1919–1922), C Company, Dungannon Battalion, No. 1 Brigade, 2nd Northern Division
 John Hamill, Irish Republican Army (1919–1922), C Company, Dungannon Battalion, No. 1 Brigade, 2nd Northern Division
 Patrick Hamill, Irish Republican Army (1919–1922), D Company, Dungannon Battalion, No. 1 Brigade, 2nd Northern Division
 Arthur & Patrick Hamill, Irish Republican Army (1919–1922), D Company, Dungannon Battalion, No. 1 Brigade, 2nd Northern Division
 Michael Hamill, Irish Republican Army (1919–1922), F Company, Dungannon Battalion, No. 1 Brigade, 2nd Northern Division
 Francis Hamill, Irish Republican Army (1919–1922), G Company, Dungannon Battalion, No. 1 Brigade, 2nd Northern Division
 Sáir Seán Ó hÁmaill (sic), Sgt. John Hamill (died Cyprus 7/4/1965), Memorial: Irish Army United Nations Service, located Section 40, South Section (E) of Glasnevin Cemetery.

Notable people with Anglicised variants include
 Hamill Surname List
 Hammill Surname List

Places
 Hamill, South Dakota

Variations
While Hamell in Irish is spelt Ó hÁmaill, it is often incorrectly used as the Irish version of Hami'll.

Unrelated names – same spelling
There are several surnames that are spelt the same but are unrelated:
 Some Scottish Hamill's are of Norman origin and are named after a location; Haineville or Henneville in Manche, France. Which itself was named from the Germanic personal name Hagano and the Old French ville for 'settlement'.
 The English Hamill's of Saxon origin are named after a nickname from Middle English, and the Old English "hamel".
 The English/Scottish Hamilton's are named after a location; the village of Hamilton, Leicestershire, England.

External links 
 Finte na hÉireann (Clans of Ireland)

References

Irish clans
Irish-language masculine surnames
Surnames of Irish origin
Patronymic surnames